José Miguel Granadino León (born 28 September 1988) is a Salvadoran former footballer who played as a defender.

Club career
Granadino played his entire career for FAS.

Lifeban for match-fixing
On 20 September 2013, José Miguel Granadino and 13 other players of El Salvador were banned for life, the players were accused of receiving bribes such as a 5–0 defeat against Mexico in 2011 and a 4–2 loss against Paraguay in February 2013.

References

External links
 El Grafico profile 

1988 births
Living people
Sportspeople from Santa Ana, El Salvador
Association football central defenders
Salvadoran footballers
El Salvador international footballers
2013 Copa Centroamericana players
2013 CONCACAF Gold Cup players
C.D. FAS footballers
Sportspeople involved in betting scandals
Sportspeople banned for life